Sir George Hyde (1570 – March/April 1623) was an English politician and appointed Knight of the Order of the Bath.

Hyde was the eldest son of William Hyde of South Denchworth in Berkshire (now Oxfordshire) and his wife Catherine daughter of George Gill of Wyddial in Hertfordshire. The family had been influential in Berkshire for centuries. Hyde was the stepson of Richard Lovelace. He was MP for Tamworth, where his wife came from, in 1597 and for Berkshire in 1601. He was succeeded in that office by Francis Knollys.

He was appointed Knight of the Order of the Bath. He lived at Kingston Lisle Park in Berkshire (now Oxfordshire) and built the house preceding the present one.

References

1570 births
1623 deaths
Members of the Parliament of England for Berkshire
People from Vale of White Horse (district)
George
Knights of the Bath
English MPs 1597–1598
English MPs 1601